The men's 200 metre freestyle competition at the 2014 South American Games took place on March 7 at the Estadio Nacional.  The last champion was Federico Grabich of Argentina.

This race consisted of four lengths of the pool, all in freestyle.

Records
Prior to this competition, the existing world and Pan Pacific records were as follows:

Results
All times are in minutes and seconds.

Heats
The first round was held on March 7, at 12:31.

Final 
The final was held on March 7, at 20:34.

References

Swimming at the 2014 South American Games